The Argova is a left tributary of the river Mostiștea in Romania. It flows into the Mostiștea in Curătești.

References

Rivers of Romania
Rivers of Călărași County